Illinois Public Interest Research Group (Illinois PIRG) is a non-profit organization that is part of the state PIRG organizations. It works on a variety of political activities, including childhood obesity, reducing the interest on student loans, and closing tax loopholes.

In the United States, Public Interest Research Groups (PIRGs) are non-profit organizations that employ grassroots organizing, direct advocacy, investigative journalism, and litigation to affect public policy.

History

Illinois PIRG was founded in 1987, and has offices in Chicago, Springfield, IL, and a national lobbying office in Washington, D.C. called US PIRG.

The PIRGs emerged in the early 1970s on U.S. college campuses. The PIRG model was proposed in the book Action for a Change by Ralph Nader and Donald Ross. 
Among other early accomplishments, the PIRGs were responsible for much of the Container Container Deposit Legislation in the United States, also known as "bottle bills."

Notable members and alumni

Phil Radford

Affiliate organizations
The Fund for Public Interest Research
Environment Illinois

References

External links
U.S. Public Interest Research Group (U.S. PIRG)
The Student PIRGs
The Public Interest Network

Non-profit organizations based in Illinois
Renewable energy commercialization
Environmental ethics
Public Interest Research Groups
Consumer rights activists